The 1967–68 season was Mansfield Town's 31st season in the Football League and 7th in the Third Division, they finished in 21st position with 37 points only avoiding relegation after Peterborough United were docked 19 points by the League for making irregular payments to players.

Final league table

Results

Football League Third Division

FA Cup

League Cup

Squad statistics
 Squad list sourced from

References
General
 Mansfield Town 1967–68 at soccerbase.com (use drop down list to select relevant season)

Specific

Mansfield Town F.C. seasons
Mansfield Town